Prak Sokhonn (born 3 May 1954) is a Cambodian politician, diplomat and journalist, currently serving in the Cabinet of Cambodia as Minister of Foreign Affairs of Cambodia since 2016, and Deputy Prime Minister of Cambodia since 2018.

Early life and education
Sokhonn was born on 3 May 1954 in Phnom Penh, Cambodia. Sokhonn studied law in Phnom Penh between 1972 to 1975.

Career 

Sokhonn entered the Kampuchean People's Revolutionary Armed Forces in 1979, eventually becoming a 4-star general as well as the Spokesman of the Royal Cambodian Armed Forces. He also spent three years as an ambassador in Europe.

He was the Minister of Posts and Telecommunications from 2013 to 2016.

He was sworn in as foreign minister on April 5, 2016. His predecessor Hor Namhong retired from his post as foreign minister on 4 April 2016 after 17 years in office, though remained as a deputy prime minister.

Prior to being named Minister of Posts and Telecommunications, Sokhonn was Vice-President of the Cambodian Mine Action and Victim Assistance Authority, which regulates landmine clearance and assistance to landmine survivors in Cambodia. During that tenure, he was elected to chair the Anti-Personnel Mine Ban Convention, better known as the Ottawa Treaty, aimed at eliminating landmines around the world, for one year, including presiding over the diplomatic treaty's meeting in Phnom Penh. As President of the conference, he tried to promote adherence to the landmine treaty in South East Asia, succeeding in securing the participation of Myanmar in the meeting The Eleventh Meeting of the States Parties to the Anti-Personnel Mine Ban Convention (11MSP) chaired by Sokhonn, was the largest international gathering ever hosted in Cambodia.

In November 2021, Hun Sen signaled he may replace Erywan Yusof with Sokhonn, who has criticized the Burmese military regime, when Cambodia chairs ASEAN next year, as ASEAN's special envoy to Myanmar. Sokhonn was confirmed to succeed Yusof on 1 January 2022.

Personal life 
Sokhonn is married to Kheng Samvada, and they have a daughter and two sons. He speaks fluent Khmer, French, and English.

See also
List of foreign ministers in 2016
List of foreign ministers in 2017
List of current foreign ministers

References

External links

|-
 

1954 births
Living people
Cambodian Buddhists
21st-century Cambodian politicians 
People from Phnom Penh
Cambodian People's Party politicians
Deputy Prime Ministers of Cambodia
Government ministers of Cambodia
Members of the National Assembly (Cambodia)
Recipients of the Legion of Honour
Foreign ministers of Cambodia
Cambodian military personnel
Cambodian generals